Mark Killeen is a British film and television actor.

His first major role was in Rise of the Footsoldier. He plays the lead role in two romantic comedies from 2013 - British feature The Callback Queen and The Right Juice, filmed in the Algarve. He appeared in The Dark Knight Rises opposite Anne Hathaway and plays the Greek Commander in 300: Rise of an Empire.

On television he appeared in the Doctor Who episode "Let's Kill Hitler", as well as two episodes of Waking the Dead. He played the prominent guest star role of Mero, the Titan's Bastard in HBO Series Game of Thrones, episode 8 of season 3 "Second Sons", alongside Emilia Clarke. He also appears as Ken's father in Street Fighter: Assassin's Fist.

References

Living people
British male film actors
British male television actors
21st-century British male actors
Year of birth missing (living people)
Place of birth missing (living people)